Hackerman Ridge is a large mountainous ridge trending north-south between Gruendler Glacier and Rudolph Glacier, in the Victory Mountains of Victoria Land, Antarctica. It was named by the Advisory Committee on Antarctic Names for Norman Hackerman, a member of the National Science Board, 1968–78, and Chairman since 1974. He visited Antarctica in 1975 and 1977 as part of his official duties in support of the U.S. scientific program in Antarctica.

References

Ridges of Victoria Land
Borchgrevink Coast